Christophe Tassin (born in the early 1600s in France; died in 1660 in France), also known as Nicolas Tassin, Christophe Nicolas Tassin or Christophe Le Tassin, was a French cartographer, known for his atlases of France, Spain, Germany and Switzerland. Most of his work was published in Paris from 1633 to 1635. Among his colleagues were Melchior Tavernier (1594–1665), Sébastien Cramoisy (1584–1669) and Michael van Lochum (1601–1647). Little is known of his personal life.

Career 
Up to 1631 Christophe Tassin was a French Royal Engineer and Geographer, working on assigned political and military projects.  As part of his appointment, he received the right to publish his work for ten years, though he used it only between 1633 and 1638.  (His successor as Royal Engineer and Geographer and publisher was Sébastien de Beaulieu [1612–1674].)

In 1633 Tassin published an atlas of France and Spain, ; one of Germany, ; and one of the Low Countries, .

In 1634 he published his magnum opus, an atlas – in an oblong quarto format, for which he is best known – with maps, views and plans of cities and other places in France, as well as a coastal atlas of France, .

In 1635 he published an atlas of Switzerland, . His inclusion of the Low Countries in a single volume had a practical reason: in 1631 a great part of the region had been conquered by King Louis XIII of France, which caused a need for rapidly published information.

In 1644 Tassin ended his work, and sold his copper plates of maps to Antoine de Fer (16xx–1673), who published them in many subsequent editions.

References

Notes

Sources

External links 

 Bibliothèque nationale de France Entry for Christophe Tassin
 Bayerische Staatsbibliothek Atlas of French towns in a 1638 edition.
 Bayerische Staatsbibliothek Atlas of Germany in a 1633 edition.

French cartographers
1660 deaths
17th-century cartographers